Piece by Piece is a rock album by John Martyn. Recorded at CaVa Sound Workshops, Glasgow, Scotland. Originally released on LP by Island, catalogue number ILPS 9807, with cover photography by Mike Owen.

Track listing
All tracks composed by John Martyn except where indicated.

"Nightline" 5:04
"Lonely Love" 3:22
"Angeline" 4:45
"One Step Too Far" 3:18
"Piece By Piece" (Foster Paterson) 3:56
"Serendipity" 4:08
"Who Believes In Angels" 4:36
"Love Of Mine" 4:47
"John Wayne" 6:55

Personnel
John Martyn - guitars, vocals, guitar synthesizers
Foster Patterson - keyboards, backing vocals
Alan Thomson - fretless bass
Danny Cummings - percussion
Colin Tully - saxophone

External links
The Official John Martyn Website

John Martyn albums
1986 albums
Island Records albums